Simó de Guardiola y Hortoneda (1773–1851) was Bishop of Urgel and ex officio Co-Prince of Andorra from 1827 to 1851.

References 

1773 births
1851 deaths
19th-century Princes of Andorra
Bishops of Urgell
18th-century Roman Catholic bishops in Spain
19th-century Roman Catholic bishops in Spain